Central Office for Jewish Emigration was a designation of Nazi institutions in Vienna, Prague and Amsterdam. Their head office, the Reich Central Office for Jewish Emigration, was based in Berlin. Their purpose was to expel Jews from Nazi-controlled areas.

History 
The office in Vienna, created in the former Palais Albert Rothschild at Prinz-Eugen-Straße 20-22, was founded in August of 1938 by Adolf Eichmann. He began the office as a way of getting around the red tape the Jews of Austria faced when trying to leave the country. Eichmann, wanting to speed up the rate at which Jews left areas of Nazi-controlled land, created an efficient machine to quicken the pace:

I immediately said: this is like an automatic factory, let us say a flour mill connected to some bakery. You put in at the one end a Jew who still has capital and has, let us say, a factory or a shop or an account in a bank, and he passes through the entire building, from counter to counter, from office to office – he comes out at the other end, he has no money, he has no rights, only a passport in which is written: You must leave this country within two weeks; if you fail to do so, you will go to a concentration camp.

Every organization, public or private, which was associated with emigration was required to have a representative at the Central Office. The Central Office answered to the Sicherheitsdienst (Security Service; SD) office in Berlin.

The Central Office paid for the emigration of the Jews by taking money from wealthier Jews and using it to expel their fellows.

Following the Vienna branch, Eichmann opened another branch in Prague. Eventually, Eichmann set up a Central Office so that all arrangements for emigration could be made in one location. On 24 January 1939, the Reich Central Office for Jewish Emigration (Reichszentrale für jüdische Auswanderung) was established in Berlin by Hermann Göring with Reinhard Heydrich at the head. It was charged with the task of using all available means to prompt Jews to emigrate, and of establishing a Jewish organization that would incorporate all of German Jewry and co-ordinate emigration from the Jewish side.

References

Jewish emigration from Nazi Germany
Reich Security Main Office